The Lancashire Women's cricket team is the women's representative cricket team for the English historic county of Lancashire. They play their home games at various grounds across the county, including Beaconsfield Road, Widnes. They are coached by Chris Chambers and captained by Eleanor Threlkeld. They won both the County Championship and the Twenty20 Cup in 2017. Lancashire have links with Cumbria, with some players playing for both sides, as well as some of their players helping make up a North Representative XI. They are partnered with the regional side North West Thunder.

History

1930–1997: Early History
Lancashire Women played their first game in 1930, against the Women's Cricket Association, which they won by 111 runs. Over the following years, Lancashire played various one-off games, often against nearby counties such as Yorkshire and Cheshire. They also competed in the Women's Area Championship, and the inaugural Women's County Championship, as a combined team with Cheshire, Lancashire and Cheshire Women.

1998– : Women's County Championship
1998 was the first season in which Lancashire competed in the County Championship on their own, and they finished 3rd in Division 3, before being promoted the following season. Over the following seasons, Lancashire bounced between the divisions, having a four-year stint in Division One, from 2004 to 2007, but also reaching as low as Division Three in 2010 and 2011. They topped Division Two in 2013 and 2014: in 2013 they lost the Division Final to Somerset, but managed to gain promotion in 2014. They were relegated in 2015, but bounced straight back up to Division One in 2016.

Lancashire then went on to have an exceptional 2017 season, in which they won both the County Championship and the Women's Twenty20 Cup. In the Championship, they topped Division One with 5 wins from 7 games. Lancashire bowler Sophie Ecclestone was the leading wicket-taker in the Division, while Amy Satterthwaite and Evelyn Jones were the 3rd and 4th leading run-scorers, respectively. Meanwhile in the T20 Cup, Lancashire won 7 from 8 games to claim the title, with batter Emma Lamb ending the tournament as the leading run-scorer for the division. In the following years, Lancashire retained their place in Division One of the Championship without seriously challenging for the title, whilst managing a second-place finish in the 2019 Women's Twenty20 Cup, one point behind Champions Warwickshire. In 2021, they competed in the North Group of the Twenty20 Cup, and won their region, with 4 wins and 4 matches abandoned due to rain. Batter Emma Lamb was the third-highest run-scorer across the competition, with 233 runs including one century. They again won their group in the 2022 Women's Twenty20 Cup, going unbeaten in the group stage before beating Yorkshire in the final. Batter Georgie Boyce was the leading run-scorer in the competition, with 306 runs, whilst bowlers Alex Hartley and Phoebe Graham were joint-second leading wicket-takers, with 13 wickets.

Players

Current squad
Based on appearances in the 2022 season.  denotes players with international caps.

Notable players
Players who have played for Lancashire and played internationally are listed below, in order of first international appearance (given in brackets):

 Joy Liebert (1934)
 Betty Snowball (1934)
 June Bragger (1963)
 Avril Starling (1982)
 Carole Hodges (1982)
 Laura Newton (1997)
 Sune van Zyl (1999)
 Arran Brindle (1999)
 Leanne Davis (2000)
 Nelly Williams (2003)
 Lonell de Beer (2005)
 Amy Satterthwaite (2007)
 Kate Cross (2013)
 Alex Hartley (2016)
 Sophie Ecclestone (2016)
 Jasmine Titmuss (2019)
 Emma Lamb (2021)

Seasons

Women's County Championship

Women's Twenty20 Cup

Honours
 County Championship:
 Division One champions (1) – 2018
 Division Two champions (3) – 2003, 2014 & 2016
 Division Three champions (1) – 1999
 Women's Twenty20 Cup
 Division One champions (1) – 2017
 Division Two champions (1) – 2015
 Group winners (1) – 2021 & 2022

See also
 Lancashire County Cricket Club
 North West Thunder
 North Representative XI

References

Cricket in Lancashire
Women's cricket teams in England